Demographics of Kazakhstan
Cities and towns in Kazakhstan
Kazakhstan